The Russian Archaeological Institute of Constantinople was founded in 1895 and led by two distinguished Russian Byzantinists, Fyodor Uspensky and Nikodim Kondakov. The institute carried out excavations and studies across the entire Ottoman Empire, carrying off large numbers of relics, manuscripts and other finds to Russia. Aside from its research role, the institute was from the outset intended as a statement of foreign policy, following the Russian Empire's claim to be the inheritor of the Byzantine Empire as the "Third Rome", and its long-standing ambition to conquer Istanbul from the Ottoman Empire. The institute continued to function until the outbreak of the First World War in 1914.

Sources 
 
 

1895 establishments in the Ottoman Empire
Organizations based in Istanbul
Byzantine studies
Archaeological research institutes
Ottoman Empire–Russian Empire relations